The 2021 Split local elections were elections for the 72nd Mayor of Split, the two deputy mayors and the 31 members of the Split City Council. It is a part of the Croatian local elections, which are taking place on 16 and 30 May 2021. 
The incumbent mayor, Andro Krstulović Opara of the Croatian Democratic Union, announced on 6 February 2021 that he will not run for another term because of his health condition.

Mayoral election

Council election

See also 

 2021 Croatian local elections
 2021 Zagreb local elections
 2021 Rijeka local elections
 2021 Osijek local elections
 List of mayors in Croatia
 List of mayors of Split

References 

Split 2021
Split
Split local
History of Split, Croatia